The 2017–18 Copa Argentina (officially the Copa Total Argentina 2017–18 for sponsorship reasons) was the ninth edition of the Copa Argentina, and the seventh since the relaunch of the tournament in 2011. The competition began on 19 January 2018 and ended on 6 December 2018.

Rosario Central defeated Gimnasia y Esgrima (LP) on penalties in the Final to win their first title. As champions, Rosario Central qualified for 2018 Supercopa Argentina and 2019 Copa Libertadores.

River Plate, the defending champions, were eliminated by Gimnasia y Esgrima (LP) in the Semifinals.

Teams
One hundred teams took part in this competition: All teams from the Primera División (28); twelve teams of the Primera B Nacional; five from the Primera B, four from the Primera C; three from the Primera D; thirty-two teams from Federal A and sixteen from Federal B.

First Level

Primera División
All twenty-eight teams qualified.

 Argentinos Juniors
 Arsenal
 Atlético Tucumán
 Banfield
 Belgrano
 Boca Juniors
 Chacarita Juniors
 Colón
 Defensa y Justicia
 Estudiantes (LP)
 Gimnasia y Esgrima (LP)
 Godoy Cruz
 Huracán
 Independiente
 Lanús
 Newell's Old Boys
 Olimpo
 Patronato
 Racing
 River Plate
 Rosario Central
 San Lorenzo
 San Martín (SJ)
 Talleres (C)
 Temperley
 Tigre
 Unión
 Vélez Sarsfield

Second Level

Primera B Nacional
The best twelve teams at the 13th round of 2017-18 tournament qualified.

 Agropecuario Argentino
 Aldosivi
 Almagro
 Atlético de Rafaela
 Brown
 Deportivo Morón
 Gimnasia y Esgrima (J)
 Guillermo Brown
 Juventud Unida (G)
 Mitre (SdE)
 San Martín (T)
 Villa Dálmine

Third Level

Primera B Metropolitana
The top-five teams at the 17th round of 2017-18 Primera B tournament qualified.

 Defensores de Belgrano
 Estudiantes (BA)
 Platense
 Tristán Suárez
 UAI Urquiza

Torneo Federal A
The first eight teams of each zone of the 2017–18 tournament qualified.

 Altos Hornos Zapla
 Alvarado
 Central Córdoba (SdE)
 Chaco For Ever
 Cipolletti
 Crucero del Norte
 Defensores (P)

 Deportivo Maipú
 Deportivo Roca
 Desamparados
 Douglas Haig
 Estudiantes (RC)
 Ferro Carril Oeste (GP)
 Gimnasia y Esgrima (CdU)
 Gimnasia y Esgrima (M)
 Gimnasia y Tiro
 Huracán Las Heras
 Independiente (N)
 Juventud Antoniana

 Rivadavia (L)
 San Jorge (T)
 San Lorenzo (A)
 Sansinena
 Sarmiento (R)
 Sportivo Belgrano
 Sportivo Las Parejas
 Sportivo Patria
 Unión (S)
 Unión (VK)
 Villa Mitre

Fourth Level

Primera C Metropolitana
The top-four teams at the 19th round of 2017-18 Primera C tournament qualified.

 Central Córdoba (R)
 Defensores Unidos
 Luján
 Midland

Torneo Federal B
The top-four teams of each zone of the 2017-18 Federal B tournament qualified.

 Atlético Pellegrini
 Central Norte
 Deportivo Achirense
 Deportivo Camioneros
 Deportivo Rincón
 Ferro Carril Sud
 Huracán (SR)
 Independiente (Ch)
 Racing (C)
 Racing (O)
 San Jorge
 San Martín (F)
 Sarmiento (L)
 Sol de América
 Sol de Mayo
 Sportivo Peñarol (Ch)

Fifth Level

Primera D Metropolitana
The top-three teams at the 15th round of 2017-18 Primera D tournament qualified.

 Central Ballester
 General Lamadrid
 Victoriano Arenas

Regional Round
This round was organized by the Consejo Federal.

Group A: Federal A

Round I
In the Round I, 32 teams from the Torneo Federal A participated. The round was played between 19 and 24 January, on a home-and-away two-legged tie. The 16 winning teams advanced to the Round II.

|-

|-

|-

|-

|-

|-

|-

|-

|-

|-

|-

|-

|-

|-

|-

|-

|}

First leg

Second leg

Round II
In the Round II, 16 qualified teams from the Round I participated. The round was played between 27 January and 21 February, on a home-and-away two-legged tie with best team in the Torneo Federal A hosting the second leg. The 8 winning teams advanced to the Final Round.

|-

|-

|-

|-

|-

|-

|-

|-

|}

First leg

Second leg

Group B: Federal B

Round I
In the Round I, 16 teams from the Torneo Federal B participated. The round was played between 26 January and 17 March, on a home-and-away two-legged tie. The 8 winning teams advanced to the Round II.

|-

|-

|-

|-

|-

|-

|-

|-

|}

First leg

Second leg

Round II
In the Round II, 8 qualified teams from the Round I participated. The round was played between 10 February and 31 March, on a home-and-away two-legged tie with best team in the Torneo Federal B hosting the second leg. The 4 winning teams advanced to the Final Round.

|-

|-

|-

|-

|}

First leg

Second leg

Final Rounds

Draw
The draw for the Final Rounds was held on 6 March 2018, 12:00 at AFA Futsal Stadium in Ezeiza. The 64 qualified teams were divided in four groups with 16 teams each. Teams were seeded by their historical performance and Division. Champions of AFA tournaments were allocated to Group A. The matches were drawn from the respective confronts: A vs. C; B vs. D. Some combinations were avoided for security reasons.

Bracket

Upper bracket

Lower bracket

Round of 64
The Round of 64 had 12 qualified teams from the Regional Round (8 teams from Torneo Federal A and 4 teams from Torneo Federal B), 12 qualified teams from the Metropolitan Zone (5 teams from Primera B Metropolitana; 4 teams from Primera C and 3 teams from Primera D), 12 teams from Primera B Nacional and 28 teams from Primera División. The round was played between 9 May and 2 August, in a single knock-out match format. The 32 winning teams advanced to the Round of 32.

Round of 32
This round had 32 qualified teams from the Round of 64. The round was played between 28 July and 10 September, in a single knock-out match format. The 16 winning teams advanced to the Round of 16.

Round of 16
This round had the 16 qualified teams from the Round of 32. The round was played between 8 September and 3 October, in a single knock-out match format. The 8 winning teams advanced to the Quarterfinals.

Quarterfinals
This round had the 8 qualified teams from the Round of 16. The round was played between 7 October and 1 November, in a single knock-out match format. The 4 winning teams advanced to the Semifinals.

The Rosario derby (Newell's Old Boys vs. Rosario Central) was played behind closed doors preventing potentially dangerous clashes between rival supporters.

Semifinals
This round had the 4 qualified teams from the Quarterfinals. The round was played on 18 and 28 November, in a single knock-out match format. The 2 winning teams advanced to the Final.

Final

Top goalscorers

Team of the tournament

See also
2017–18 Argentine Primera División

References

External links 
 Official site 
 Copa Argentina on the Argentine Football Association's website 

2017
Argentina
2017 in Argentine football
2018 in Argentine football